Kamenka is a rural locality (a settlement) in Brasovsky District, Bryansk Oblast, Russia. The population was 1,734 as of 2013.

Geography 
Kamenka is located 12 km southwest of Lokot (the district's administrative centre) by road. Trostnaya is the nearest rural locality.

References 

Rural localities in Brasovsky District